New Vienna is a village in Clinton County, Ohio, United States. The population was 1,224 at the 2010 census.

History
New Vienna was originally called Buzzard's Glory, and under the latter name was laid out in 1835.

Gallery

Geography
New Vienna is located at  (39.324126, -83.691848).

Demographics

2010 census
As of the census of 2010, there were 1,224 people, 478 households, and 322 families living in the village. The racial makeup of the village was 96.7% White, 0.8% African American, 0.4% Native American, 0.3% Asian, 0.5% from other races, and 1.2% from two or more races. Hispanic or Latino of any race were 0.7% of the population.

There were 478 households, of which 35.8% had children under the age of 18 living with them, 45.4% were married couples living together, 15.7% had a female householder with no husband present, 6.3% had a male householder with no wife present, and 32.6% were non-families. 27.0% of all households were made up of individuals, and 11.3% had someone living alone who was 65 years of age or older. The average household size was 2.56 and the average family size was 3.03.

The median age in the village was 35.7 years. 26.5% of residents were under the age of 18; 7.3% were between the ages of 18 and 24; 29.2% were from 25 to 44; 26.3% were from 45 to 64; and 10.8% were 65 years of age or older. The gender makeup of the village was 47.9% male and 52.1% female.

2000 census
As of the census of 2000, there were 1,294 people, 497 households, and 330 families living in the village. The population density was 1,619.0 people per square mile (624.5/km2). There were 555 housing units at an average density of 694.4 per square mile (267.9/km2). The racial makeup of the village was 97.76% White, 0.31% African American, 1.08% Native American, 0.08% Asian, 0.31% from other races, and 0.46% from two or more races. Hispanic or Latino of any race were 0.77% of the population.

There were 497 households, out of which 38.6% had children under the age of 18 living with them, 46.9% were married couples living together, 13.7% had a female householder with no husband present, and 33.6% were non-families. 27.8% of all households were made up of individuals, and 10.9% had someone living alone who was 65 years of age or older. The average household size was 2.60 and the average family size was 3.16.

In the village, the population was spread out, with 31.0% under the age of 18, 9.7% from 18 to 24, 30.4% from 25 to 44, 19.6% from 45 to 64, and 9.4% who were 65 years of age or older. The median age was 32 years. For every 100 females there were 83.5 males. For every 100 females age 18 and over, there were 84.1 males.

The median income for a household in the village was $31,750, and the median income for a family was $36,339. Males had a median income of $31,471 versus $21,042 for females. The per capita income for the village was $13,966. About 9.1% of families and 10.8% of the population were below the poverty line, including 13.8% of those under age 18 and 6.7% of those age 65 or over.

Notable people

 Chuck Collier, longtime disc jockey at radio stations WGAR (AM) (1970–1990) and WGAR-FM (1986–2011) in Cleveland, Ohio
 Julius Houseman, former mayor of Grand Rapids, Michigan, member of the Michigan House of Representatives, and member of the U.S. House of Representatives
 James G. Polk, Democratic Party politician

References

Villages in Clinton County, Ohio
Villages in Ohio